Vida Opoku (born 15 December 1997) is a Ghanaian international footballer who plays as a defender. She has appeared in three matches for the Ghana women's national under-17 football team. She was on the Squad at the 2012 FIFA U-17 Women's World Cup, 2014 FIFA U-17 Women's World Cup and the 2016 FIFA U-20 Women's World Cup.

References

Living people
1997 births
Ghana women's international footballers
Women's association football defenders
Ghanaian women's footballers
Lady Strikers F.C. players